Pleudihen-sur-Rance (literally Pleudihen on Rance) is a commune in the Côtes-d'Armor department of Brittany in northwestern France.

It is known for the production of apples and Breton champagne (cider).

During the latter half of the 18th century, the town took in a large share of 2,000 Acadians who were deported to France against their will.

Geography
Located only a couple of miles from the Rance, Pleudihen-sur-Rance is accessible via the D29 that goes to La Vicomté-sur-Rance to the south (4 miles) and Châteauneuf-d'Ille-et-Vilaine (8 miles) to the north.

Population

Inhabitants of Pleudihen-sur-Rance are called pleudihennais in French.

Attractions
The Musée de la Pomme et du Cidre (The Apple and Cider Museum), located in a farmhouse within town, is a prominent attraction, displaying various types of apple trees, production methods, and offers cider tasting.

Partnership
Pleudihen-sur-Rance maintains a town partnership with the German community of Herschbach in the Westerwaldkreis, Rhineland-Palatinate.

See also
Communes of the Côtes-d'Armor department

References

External links

 Cider production in Brittany

Communes of Côtes-d'Armor